"I'll Go to My Grave Loving You" is a song written by Don Reid, and recorded by American country music group The Statler Brothers.  It was released in May 1975 as the first single from their compilation album The Best of the Statler Brothers.  The song peaked at number 3 on the Billboard Hot Country Singles chart, and number 1 on the Cashbox Country Top 100. It also reached number 1 on the RPM Country Tracks chart in Canada. It is based upon a song by Harold Reid, another member of the group, called "He Went to the Cross Loving You".

Chart performance

References

1975 singles
The Statler Brothers songs
Song recordings produced by Jerry Kennedy
Songs written by Don Reid (singer)
Mercury Records singles
1975 songs